Nasrin Pillane (born in Balaka), is a Malawian politician. She is a Member of Parliament for Balaka West constituency in Malawi under the Democratic Progressive Party (Malawi) ticket. She is currently serving as the Deputy Minister for Gender, Child and Community Development in the new Cabinet of Malawi under Minister Reen Kachere.

References

Democratic Progressive Party (Malawi) politicians
Living people
Members of the National Assembly (Malawi)
People from Balaka District
Year of birth missing (living people)